Flemming Weis  (15 April 1898 – 30 September 1981) was a Danish composer.

See also
List of Danish composers

References
This article was initially translated from the Danish Wikipedia.

Male composers
1898 births
1981 deaths
20th-century Danish composers
20th-century Danish male musicians